This is a list of Norwegian television related events from 2009.

Events
8 May - Male hip hop dance group Quick win the second series of Norske Talenter.
16 May - Norway wins the 54th Eurovision Song Contest in Moscow, Russia. The winning song is "Fairytale", performed by Alexander Rybak.
11 September - Launch of the Norwegian version of The X Factor.
21 November - TV2 sports presenter Carsten Skjelbreid and his partner Elena Bokoreva Wiulsrud win the fifth series of Skal vi danse?.
18 December - Chand Torsvik wins the first series of X Factor.

Debuts

11 September - X Factor (2009-2010)

Television shows

2000s
Skal vi danse? (2006–present)
Norske Talenter (2008–present)

Ending this year

Births

Deaths

See also
2009 in Norway